Erich Gallwitz (5 July 1912 in Reutte – 1 October 1981 in Salzburg) was an Austrian cross-country skier who competed in the 1936 Winter Olympics.

In 1936 he was a member of the Austrian relay team which finished eighth in the 4x10 km relay competition. In the 18 km event he finished 41st.

External links
Austrian Olympic Committee
Erich Gallwitz's profile at Sports Reference.com

1912 births
1981 deaths
Austrian male cross-country skiers
Olympic cross-country skiers of Austria
Cross-country skiers at the 1936 Winter Olympics
People from Reutte District
Sportspeople from Tyrol (state)